Toliprolol is a beta adrenergic receptor antagonist.

References

Beta blockers`
N-isopropyl-phenoxypropanolamines